Sughanchi Kuh (also Romanized as Sūghānchī Kūh; also known as Sūhānchī Kūh) is a village in Varqeh Rural District, in the Central District of Charuymaq County, East Azerbaijan Province, Iran. At the 2006 census, its population was 212, in 36 families.

References 

Populated places in Charuymaq County